Simone Velasco (born 2 December 1995 in Bologna) is an Italian cyclist, who currently rides for UCI WorldTeam .

Major results

2013
 1st Trofeo Città di Loano
 1st GP dell'Arno
 2nd Trofeo Dorigo Porte
 5th Overall Giro della Lunigiana
2014
 2nd Trofeo Edil C
2015
 1st Coppa della Pace
 1st Ruota d'Oro
 2nd Gran Premio di Poggiana
 2nd GP Capodarco
 4th Overall Giro della Regione Friuli Venezia Giulia
 8th Trofeo Città di San Vendemiano
2017
 9th Trofeo Matteotti
2018
 5th Trofeo Matteotti
 7th Overall Tour of Hainan
 10th Gran Piemonte
2019
 1st Trofeo Laigueglia
 1st Stage 3 Settimana Internazionale di Coppi e Bartali
 3rd Coppa Sabatini
 8th Gran Premio di Lugano
 10th Giro dell'Appennino
 10th Memorial Marco Pantani
2020
 4th Trofeo Matteotti
 7th Memorial Marco Pantani
2021
 2nd Tour du Jura
 4th Giro dell'Appennino
 4th Coppa Ugo Agostoni
 6th Overall Tour du Limousin
1st Stage 3
 6th Overall Giro di Sicilia
 6th Gran Premio di Lugano
 7th Coppa Sabatini
 9th Overall Czech Cycling Tour
 9th Giro del Veneto
2023
 1st Stage 3 Volta a la Comunitat Valenciana

Grand Tour general classification results timeline

References

External links

1995 births
Living people
Cyclists from Bologna
Italian male cyclists